Maston is both a surname and a given name. Notable people with the name include:

Surname:
Carl Maston (1915–1992), American architect
June Maston (1928–2004), Australian sprinter
Le'Shai Maston (born 1970), American football player
Mercy Maston (born 1992), Canadian football player
T. B. Maston (1897–1988), American writer

Given name:
Maston E. O'Neal, Jr.  (1907–1990), American politician
Maston Williams (1879–1978), American actor

See also
Maston House, historic house in Seaford, Sussex County, Delaware, United States